In cricket, a five-wicket haul (also known as a "five–for" or "fifer") refers to a bowler taking five or more wickets in a single innings. This is regarded as a notable achievement. As of May 2021, 159 cricketers have taken a five-wicket haul on their debut in a Test match, with nine of them being taken by New Zealand cricketers. They have taken a five-wicket haul on debut against six different opponents: three times against England, twice against Pakistan, and once against India, South Africa, Sri Lanka and Zimbabwe each. Of the nine occasions, New Zealand won the match four times, drew three times, and lost twice. The players have taken five-wicket hauls at nine different venues, including six outside New Zealand; the most recent was taken at Sheikh Zayed Cricket Stadium, Abu Dhabi.

The first New Zealand player to take a five-wicket haul on Test debut was Fen Cresswell who took six wickets for 168 runs against England in 1949. Cresswell, Alex Moir and Colin de Grandhomme are the only bowlers to have taken six wickets each on debut. Six other players have taken five wickets on their Test debut. De Grandhomme took six wickets for 41 runs, the best bowling figures by a New Zealand bowler in an innings on Test debut, against Pakistan in 2016, at Hagley Oval. He accumulated seven wickets for 64 runs in the match, the best bowling figures by a New Zealander in a Test match on debut. De Grandhomme and Ajaz Patel are the only players to get the man of the match award on their Test debuts. Amongst the bowlers, Bruce Taylor is the only player "to achieve the all-round feat" on his Test debut against India in 1964–65 at Eden Gardens, Calcutta;  he scored 105 runs and took 5 wickets for 86 runs. Paul Wiseman's five-wicket haul is the most economical, with 1.75 runs per over, and Tim Southee has the best strike rate. As of November 2018, the most recent Zealand cricketer to achieve this feat was Ajaz Patel. Moir, Wiseman and Patel are the only spin bowlers to achieve this feat, the others being fast bowlers.

Key

Five-wicket hauls

References

Notes

Specific

New Zealand

Lists of New Zealand cricketers